Aaptos globosa is a species of sea sponge belonging to the family Suberitidae. The species was described in 1994.

References

globosa
Animals described in 1994
Taxa named by Michelle Kelly (marine scientist)
Taxa named by Patricia Bergquist